The 1991 Utah State Aggies football team represented Utah State University during the 1991 NCAA Division I-A football season as a member of the Big West Conference. The Aggies were led by head coach Chuck Shelton in his sixth and final year at Utah State and played their home games at Romney Stadium in Logan, Utah. The Aggies finished the season with an overall of record of 5–6, placing third in the Big West with a mark of 5–2.

Schedule

References

Utah State
Utah State Aggies football seasons
Utah State Aggies football